Michael Charles Gauntlet Wilding (23 July 1912 – 8 July 1979) was an English stage, television, and film actor. He is best known for a series of films he made with Anna Neagle; he also made two films with Alfred Hitchcock, Under Capricorn (1949) and Stage Fright (1950); and he guest starred on Hitchcock's TV show in 1963. He was married four times, including to Elizabeth Taylor, with whom he had two sons.

Biography

Early life
Born in Leigh-on-Sea, Essex, England, and educated at Christ's Hospital, Wilding left home at age 17 and trained as a commercial artist. He went to Europe when he was 20 and supported himself in Europe by doing sketches. He wanted to get into designing sets for films and approached a London film studio in 1933 looking for work. They invited him to come to work as an extra.

Acting career
Wilding appeared as an extra in British films such as Bitter Sweet (1933), Heads We Go (1933), and Channel Crossing (1933). He caught the acting bug and decided to make it a career. He reportedly appeared in an Austrian film called Pastorale.

He made his stage debut in The Ringer in 1934 for the Watford Repertory Company and made his London stage debut in Chase the Ace the following year. He could be spotted in the films Late Extra (1935), When Knights Were Bold (1936), and Wedding Group (1936). He was in two musicals on stage, Spread It Abroad and Home and Beauty.

In 1937–38 he toured Australia and New Zealand with Fay Compton's stage company. The plays included Personal Appearance, Victoria Regina, Tonight at Eight Thirty and George and Margaret. While in Australia he filmed a prologue for Personal Appearance.

Back in England he appeared in the first Gate Revue, then followed this with another revue, Let's Face It and a pantomime, Who's Taking Liberty.

He had bigger film parts in There Ain't No Justice (1939), Convoy (1940), and Tilly of Bloomsbury (1940). He had a good role in Sailors Three (1940), and Sailors Don't Care (1940).

Wilding had a leading role in Spring Meeting (1941) but was back to support parts in The Farmer's Wife (1941). His films grew more prestigious: Kipps (1941), Cottage to Let (1941), Ships with Wings (1941), The Big Blockade (1941), In Which We Serve (1942), Secret Mission (1942), and Undercover (1943). He played in Quiet Weekend on stage for a year. In 1943 he performed for the troops in Gibraltar with John Gielgud.

Stardom
Wilding finally became a film name with Dear Octopus (1943). He followed it with English Without Tears (1944).

Collaboration with Anna Neagle
What really made him a star was appearing opposite Anna Neagle in Piccadilly Incident (1946). Director Herbert Wilcox had wanted Rex Harrison or John Mills and had only taken Wilding reluctantly. However, once he saw the rushes he signed Wilding to a long-term contract. Piccadilly Incident was the second most popular film at the British box office in 1946. After co-starring with Sally Gray in Carnival (1946), Wilding was reunited with Neagle and Wilcox in The Courtneys of Curzon Street (1947), the biggest hit at the 1947 British box office and one of the most-seen British films of all time. Alexander Korda cast him opposite Paulette Goddard in An Ideal Husband (1947), another hit, but it failed to recoup its enormous cost. Wilding, Neagle and Wilcox reteamed for Spring in Park Lane (1948), another outstanding hit. It led to a sequel, Maytime in Mayfair (1949), which was also enormously popular.

Wilding was now one of the biggest stars in Britain—indeed he was voted as such by the readers of Kine Weekly. Director Alfred Hitchcock then cast him in two consecutive films that he produced through his own film production company Transatlantic Pictures (distributed through Warner Brothers Pictures). The first, Under Capricorn (released in 1949), in which he played opposite Ingrid Bergman and Joseph Cotten, was shot mostly in London but had final retakes and overdubs filmed in Hollywood. It was one of Hitchcock's few flops. His second film for Hitchcock was the more popular Stage Fright (released in 1950), also filmed in London, with Marlene Dietrich and Jane Wyman. Thirteen years later, in 1963, Wilding starred in an Alfred Hitchcock Hour episode titled "Last Seen Wearing Blue Jeans".

Wilcox used him in a film without Neagle, Into the Blue (1950) and the public response was considerably less enthusiastic than for the films they made together. He put Anouk Aimée under personal contract and announced plans to make a movie together but none resulted.

Hollywood
MGM made an offer for Wilding to appear opposite Greer Garson in The Law and the Lady (1951); the film was not a success. He returned to Britain for The Lady with a Lamp (1951), a biopic of Florence Nightingale with Neagle and Wilcox. It was popular in Britain, though less so than their earlier collaborations.

So too was Derby Day (1952), the last Neagle–Wilding collaboration. Wilcox tried Wilding with a new star, Margaret Lockwood, in Trent's Last Case (1952), a minor hit. In 1952 British exhibitors voted him the fourth most popular star at the local box office.

In May 1952 Wilding signed a long-term contract with MGM. He turned down a role in MGM's Latin Lovers and the studio put him under suspension.

In Hollywood, Wilding supported Joan Crawford in MGM's Torch Song (1953). 20th Century Fox borrowed him to play a pharaoh in their big budget spectacular, The Egyptian (1954), which was a box office disappointment.

At MGM he was Prince Charming to Leslie Caron's Cinderella in The Glass Slipper (1955), and Major John André in The Scarlet Coat (1956).

Supporting actor
Wilding journeyed with Taylor to Africa to appear in Zarak (1956) for Warwick Films, after which his marriage to Taylor ended. He began appearing regularly on U.S. television, including the title role in the 1957 episode "The Trial of Colonel Blood" of NBC's anthology series The Joseph Cotten Show.

He had some roles in Danger Within (1959), a POW movie; The World of Suzie Wong (1960); The Naked Edge (1961); The Best of Enemies (1961); and A Girl Named Tamiko (1962).

Final films
His last roles included The Sweet Ride (1968) and Waterloo (1970).

His last appearance in a feature was in a cameo in Lady Caroline Lamb (1972), which co-starred his last wife, Margaret Leighton. His last role was in the TV movie Frankenstein: The True Story (1973).

Box-office ranking
At the peak of his career, British exhibitors voted him among the most popular stars in the country:

 1947—seventh most popular British star
 1948—fifth most popular star
 1949—second most popular star
 1950—sixth most popular British star
 1951—tenth most popular star
 1952 fourth most popular British star

Personal life
Wilding was married four times: to Kay Young (married August 1937, separated December 1945, divorced December 1951); Elizabeth Taylor (married February 1952, separated July 1956, divorced January 1957); Susan Nell (married February 1958, divorced July 1962); and Margaret Leighton (married from July 1964 until her death in January 1976).

He and Taylor, who was 20 years his junior, had two sons, Michael Howard (born January 6, 1953) and Christopher Edward (born February 27, 1955). In 1957 he had a short-lived romance with actress Marie McDonald, who was nicknamed The Body.

In the 1960s he was forced to cut back on his film appearances because of illness related to his lifelong epilepsy.

Death
Wilding died on 8 July 1979 in Chichester, West Sussex, as a result of head injuries from a fall down a flight of stairs during an epileptic seizure. His body was cremated and the ashes were scattered.

Filmography

Television

See also

 List of British actors
 List of people educated at Christ's Hospital
 List of people from Chichester
 List of people with epilepsy

References

External links

 
 
 Photographs and literature

|-
!colspan="3" style="background:#C1D8FF;"| Husband of Elizabeth Taylor

1912 births
1979 deaths
20th-century English male actors
Accidental deaths in England
Deaths from epilepsy
Male actors from Essex
Male actors from Sussex
English talent agents
English male film actors
English male stage actors
English male television actors
People educated at Christ's Hospital
People from Chichester
People from Leigh-on-Sea
Neurological disease deaths in England
Accidental deaths from falls